Fort Pierce Westwood Academy: The WEST Prep Magnet, commonly referred to as Fort Pierce Westwood Academy, and formerly known as Fort Pierce Westwood High School, is a public high school located in Fort Pierce, Florida, United States. It is part of the St. Lucie Public Schools district.

History 
The school was founded in 1977 as Fort Pierce Westwood High School.

Beginning in the 2019-2020 academic year, the school was officially renamed to Fort Pierce Westwood Academy: The WEST Prep Magnet as part of being awarded the Magnet School Assistance Program Grant. The grant was awarded along with two other schools in St. Lucie County in order to increase enrollment and improve college readiness. More specifically, it allowed the school to offer new courses for pre-medical, pharmacy technician, and data science programs, as well as improved science laboratory facilities.

Academics

Programs

Marine and Oceanographic Academy
The WEST Prep Academy’s Marine and Oceanographic Academy (MOA) offers students a specialized curriculum focused on marine and oceanographic studies alongside general education courses. The academy is located approximately 5.5 miles northeast of WEST Prep's main campus on the campus of the Harbor Branch Oceanographic Institute. The highly immersive program offers students the opportunity to learn directly from Harbor Branch faculty and participate in hands-on field and laboratory experiences.

Athletics
Athletes from Westwood compete as the Panthers and their colors are maroon and gray.

State Championships
Girls Cross Country
Class 3A: 1991
Boys Track and Field
300-Meter Hurdles Class 4A: 1994 (38.00)
4 x 400 Meter Relay Class 4A: 1999 (3:21.89)
4 x 400 Meter Relay Class 2A: 2000 (3:18.85)
Discus Class 3A: 1991 (170' 4")
Boys Wrestling (Individual)
Class 3A: 1992 (112), 1993 (119)

Notable alumni

Athletes
Football
Jeff Blackshear, former professional football player
Yamon Figurs, former professional football player
Anthony Harris, former professional football player
Khalil Mack, current professional football player for the Los Angeles Chargers
Ryan McNeil, former professional football player
Mario Monds, former professional football player
Luther Robinson, former professional football player
Craig Swoope, former professional football player
Clarence Weathers, former professional football player
Baseball
Charles Johnson Jr., former professional baseball player and World Series Champion

Other
CeeCee Lyles, flight attendant on United Airlines Flight 93

References

1977 establishments in Florida
Educational institutions established in 1977
High schools in St. Lucie County, Florida
Public high schools in Florida